In Existence is an album by English new-age musician Phil Sawyer under the artistic name Beautiful World.

Track listing

Notes:
1 lyrics in Swahili
2 lyrics in English
3 lyrics in French
4 instrumental

Production
Producer: Phil Sawyer
Programmer: Andy Gray
Publisher: EMI-Music Publishing

Charts

Weekly charts

Year-end charts

Certifications

References

Phil Sawyer albums
1994 debut albums